Kai Kecil (Little Kai Island) is a part of the Kai Islands group of the Maluku Islands, Indonesia. The other main island in the group is Kai Besar (Great Kai Island). It contains the town of Tual.

Kai Islands
Islands of the Maluku Islands
Landforms of Maluku (province)